Christiaan Rudolph Liebenberg (born 18 December 1981) is a South African professional rugby union player who played as a hooker. He also had a short spell at French Top 14 side  in 2009.

He made his international debut for South Africa on 1 December 2007 against the Barbarians in London, aged 25. He then came up as replacement hooker against Australia in Perth on 8 September 2012 and as replacement hooker the following week against New Zealand in Dunedin, where South Africa lost by 10 points. He made a total of five test appearances for South Africa, plus the one tour match against the Barbarians.

He retired after the 2014 Currie Cup season.

References

External links
ESPN Profile
WP rugby profile
Stormers profile

1981 births
Living people
Afrikaner people
Alumni of Grey College, Bloemfontein
Cheetahs (rugby union) players
Expatriate rugby union players in France
Griquas (rugby union) players
RC Toulonnais players
Rugby union hookers
Rugby union players from Kimberley, Northern Cape
South Africa international rugby union players
South African expatriate rugby union players
South African expatriate sportspeople in France
South African people of German descent
South African rugby union players
Stormers players
Western Province (rugby union) players